"Box of Tricks" is the seventeenth episode of the second series of the 1960s cult British spy-fi television series The Avengers, starring Patrick Macnee and Julie Stevens. It was first broadcast in the Teledu Cymru region of the ITV network on Friday 18 January 1963. ABC Weekend TV, who produced the show for ITV, broadcast it the next day in its own regions. The episode was directed by Kim Mills and written by Peter Ling and Edward Rhodes.

Plot
The death of a nightclub magician's assistant leads through a crippled general and his quack, to employment opportunities and secret documents. Steed enlists the help of Venus to root out the criminals by becoming the new assistant.

Music
Julie Stevens sings It's A Pity To Say Goodnight by Ella Fitzgerald and It's De-Lovely by Cole Porter, during which - in a rarity for the entire series - she briefly breaks the fourth wall.

Cast
 Patrick Macnee as John Steed
 Julie Stevens as Venus Smith 
 Jane Barratt as Kathleen Sutherland 
 Maurice Hedley as General Sutherland 
 Edgar Wreford as Dr. Gallam 
 Ian Curry as Gerry Weston 
 April Olrich as Denise 
 Dallas Cavell as Manager 
 Jacqueline Jones as Henriette
 Robert Hartley as Nena the Barman 
 Royston Tickner as Maitre D' 
 Gail Starforth as Maid 
 Lynn Taylor as Valerie

References

External links

Episode overview on The Avengers Forever! website

The Avengers (season 2) episodes
1963 British television episodes